PNMsoft is a global software company which provides BPM (Business Process Management) software. Its product, Sequence, is a BPM software suite which enables building workflow applications with the purpose of improving business operations.

History
PNMsoft was founded in 1996 by CEO Gal Horvitz, an Israeli entrepreneur and Technion (Israel Institute of Technology) graduate. Soon after two more Technion graduates, Adi Hofstein and Sagiv Ben Shaul, joined as co-founders. In 2007, after a US$3.3 million investment from Goldrock Capital, the company opened headquarters in London UK, and expanded its global operations. As of 2016, the company has offices in the US, UK, Israel and Portugal. In August 2016, PNMsoft was acquired by Genpact, and continues to focus on BPM.

Product
PNMsoft focuses on BPM software, primarily targeting midsize to large organizations and Microsoft customers.

Sequence is PNMsoft's BPMS (Business Process Management Software). Its development environment provides an environment for designing forms, tasks, messages, system integration, and flow connections. Sequence processes are, by default, operated from within a Microsoft SharePoint site. Sequence supports integration with Microsoft SQL Server Reporting Services to enable managers to analyse performance and determine trends relating to KPIs and SLAs. In addition to integrating with Microsoft Office, SharePoint, and Dynamics products, it can be integrated with external systems through protocols such as web services, WCF. It also enables connection to enterprise applications such as SAP and Oracle. The product's architecture enables IT personnel to make changes to processes without taking them offline.

The end-user facing product is named Flowtime and runs on most modern JavaScript-enabled web browsers. The Administration client, also web-based, is named Sequence.

Recognition
Gartner 2015 iBPMS Magic Quadrant

References 

Workflow applications
Information technology management
Software companies established in 1996
Software companies of Israel

af:Besigheidsprosesbestuur
cs:Procesní řízení
el:Διοίκηση επιχειρησιακών διεργασιών
es:Gestión de procesos de negocio
hi:व्यवसाय प्रक्रिया प्रबंधन
id:Business process management
it:Business Process Management
he:Business Process Management
kn:ವ್ಯವಹಾರ ಪ್ರಕ್ರಿಯೆ ನಿರ್ವಹಣೆ
nl:Procesmanagement
ja:ビジネスプロセス管理
pl:Business Process Management
pt:Gerenciamento de processos de negócio
ta:பணிச் செயலாக்க மேலாண்மை
zh:业务流程管理